Membakut is a subdistrict in the Interior Division, Sabah, Malaysia. Located in Beaufort District, Membakut railway station is one of the stops for Sabah State Railway.

External links
  Membakut Subdistrict Office

Populated places in Sabah